Rosemarijn Agnes (Roos) Vermeij (born March 28, 1968 in The Hague) is a Dutch politician. As a member of the Labour Party (Partij van de Arbeid) she was an MP between November 30, 2006 and March 23, 2017. She focused on matters of employment and social security.

She has been an alderwoman of Rotterdam since 18 February 2021, replacing Barbara Kathmann.

Vermeij studied history at Leiden University.

Publications
 Roos Vermeij, De "vrouwendingen" van mej. mr. . Leiden, Rijksuniversiteit, 1992

References

External links 
  House of Representatives biography

1968 births
Living people
21st-century Dutch politicians
21st-century Dutch women politicians
Aldermen of Rotterdam
Labour Party (Netherlands) politicians
Leiden University alumni
Members of the House of Representatives (Netherlands)
Politicians from The Hague